Allen York (born June 17, 1989) is a Canadian former professional ice hockey goaltender who played 11 games with the Columbus Blue Jackets in the National Hockey League. York was selected by the Blue Jackets in the 6th round (158th overall) of the 2007 NHL Entry Draft.

Playing career
Prior to turning professional, York attended Rensselaer Polytechnic Institute where he played three seasons with the R.P.I. Engineers which competed in the NCAA's Division I's, ECAC Hockey conference.

On March 29, 2011, the Columbus Blue Jackets signed York to a two-year professional contract.

In his rookie professional season in 2011–12 on October 19, 2011, the Blue Jackets called up York on emergency recall from the AHL affiliate, the Springfield Falcons after injuries to Mark Dekanich and Curtis Sanford. He made his NHL debut and played his first game on October 25, 2011 against the Detroit Red Wings when Steve Mason was injured in the first period. Later in the season in a second emergency recall, on March 28, 2012 he made 29 saves for his first NHL victory, as the Columbus Blue Jackets defeated the Detroit Red Wings, 4-2.

In the following season, his final year of contract with the Blue Jackets, York remained stationed between affiliates the Springfield Falcons and Evansville IceMen of the ECHL.

A free agent from the Blue Jackets, on September 12, 2013 Allen joined the Nashville Predators training camp on a pro tryout. Unable to secure a NHL contract with Nashville, York upon his release signed to remain with the Evansville Icemen for the 2013–14 season. After an earlier single game stint with the Charlotte Checkers, on November 2, 2013, York was loaned to the Texas Stars of the AHL on a pro tryout contract before returning to the IceMen after 6 games with the Stars on December 5. Five days later, York was assigned on try-out to a short stint with the Rockford IceHogs.

On December 20, 2013, York was listed and played on team Canada's Spengler Cup roster. York played only 6 games with the IceMen before on January 14, 2014, he was traded to the South Carolina Stingrays in for future considerations. York continued his whirlwind season by later joining his fourth AHL club and sixth team in the season, in playing six game with the Syracuse Crunch on loan before returning to the Stingrays.

York was rewarded from his earlier tenure with the Crunch in signing as a free agent on one-year AHL contract with the club on July 8, 2014. After playing the first half of the 2014–15 season, with ECHL affiliate the Florida Everblades, York made his Crunch season debut on February 7, 2015 against the Springfield Falcons. On February 23, 2015, York was signed for the remainder of the season on a two-way deal with NHL affiliate, the Tampa Bay Lightning.

In the midst of the 2015–16 season, after playing with the Greenville Swamp Rabbits while under contract to the Crunch, York opted to end his professional career announcing his retirement on March 4, 2016.

Career statistics

Awards and honours

References

External links

1989 births
Living people
Camrose Kodiaks players
Canadian ice hockey goaltenders
Charlotte Checkers (2010–) players
Chicago Express players
Columbus Blue Jackets draft picks
Columbus Blue Jackets players
Evansville IceMen players
Florida Everblades players
Greenville Swamp Rabbits players
Ice hockey people from Alberta
People from Wetaskiwin
Rockford IceHogs (AHL) players
RPI Engineers men's ice hockey players
South Carolina Stingrays players
Springfield Falcons players
Syracuse Crunch players
Texas Stars players